Thiodia glandulosana is a moth of the family Tortricidae. It is found on the Canary Islands and Madeira.

The wingspan is 13–21 mm. The forewings are ochraceous suffused with brownish. The hindwings are greyish fuscous.

The larvae feed on Rhamnus glandulosa. They mine the leaves of their host plant. The young larvae create a full-depth mine which starts near the midrib and closely follows a lateral vein for its entire length. Older larvae live among spun leaves. Full-grown larvae reach a length of about 12.5 mm. They are uniformly olive green with a light brown head.

References

Moths described in 1907
Eucosmini